The  is a river in Kanagawa and Yamanashi Prefectures on the island of Honshū, Japan.

The Sagami River drains Lake Yamanaka, the largest and easternmost of the Fuji Five Lakes in Yamanashi Prefecture. It loops northwest, then northeast through Yamanashi, before following a generally southerly course to exit into Sagami Bay of the Pacific Ocean between the cities of Hiratsuka and Chigasaki. It is dammed at several locations along the way, forming a number of reservoir lakes, the largest of which are Lake Sagami and Lake Tsukui.

The river has had to re-cut its course several times due to repeated eruptions of Mount Fuji, and river terraces are in evidence along its upper reaches in Yamanashi. As the river crosses Kanagawa, it forms natural levees in the soft soils of the alluvial plains of central Kanagawa's Sagamino plateau, and forms almost no river delta as it exits into the ocean.

The potential of the upper reaches of the Sagami River for hydroelectric power development began to be developed in the 1930s, with the growth of industry and electrical consumption in the Yokohama-Kanagawa industrial belt, and the growing need for a reliable supply of drinking and industrial water. Work on the Sagami Dam began in 1938; however, lack of funding and the advent of World War II delayed completion until after the end of the war. In the post war period, the Shiroyama Dam was also completed on the main stream of the Sagami River in 1965. A number of dams have also been completed on the Nakatsu River, the main tributary of the Sagami River, including the Miyagase Dam.

External links
Sagami River Science Museum, Sagamihara

 (mouth)

Rivers of Kanagawa Prefecture
Rivers of Yamanashi Prefecture
Rivers of Japan